The Mount Zion Baptist Church is a historic church in Miami, Florida. It is located at 301 Northwest 9th Street. On December 29, 1988, it was added to the U.S. National Register of Historic Places.

References

External links

 Dade County listings at National Register of Historic Places
 Florida's Office of Cultural and Historical Programs
 Dade County listings
 Mount Zion Baptist Church

African-American history in Miami
Churches in Miami
Baptist churches in Florida
National Register of Historic Places in Miami